Döbern (Lower Sorbian Derbno) is a town in the district of Spree-Neiße, in Lower Lusatia, Brandenburg, Germany. It is situated 25 km southeast of Cottbus, and 15 km south of Forst (Lausitz).

History
From 1815 to 1947, Döbern was part of the Prussian Province of Brandenburg. From 1952 to 1990, it was part of the Bezirk Cottbus of East Germany.

Demography

References 

Populated places in Spree-Neiße